The 2019 edition of the Kerrang! Awards, a ceremony recognising achievements in rock music over the preceding twelve months, took place on June 19, 2019. As has long been the case for the Kerrang! Awards, the winners for the major categories were determined by fan votes from a shortlist of nominees, itself determined by a period of open fan nominee submissions.

Architects received the most nominations with three, namely 'Best Album', 'Best British Act', and 'Best British Live Act'. The band would ultimately walk away with only the latter award, winning it for the second consecutive year.

The event was also notable for the 'Hall of Fame' award being awarded for the first time since 2014, with Skunk Anansie winning the distinction. Feeder's frontman Grant Nicholas, who presented the band with their award, would two months later see his own band inducted into Kerrang! Radio's Hall of Fame.

The ceremony was not broadcast live but was streamed online the following evening before being uploaded to the Kerrang! YouTube channel.

Winners and Nominees
{|class="wikitable" style="width:95%"
|-bgcolor="#bebebe"
!width="50%"|Best Album (presented by Kelly Osbourne)
!width="50%"|Best Song (presented by Employed to Serve)
|-
|valign="top"|
Ghost – Prequelle
Behemoth – I Loved You at Your Darkest
Bring Me the Horizon – Amo
Architects – Holy Hell
Greta Van Fleet – Anthem of the Peaceful Army
|valign="top"|
Fever 333 – Burn It 
Bring Me the Horizon – Mantra
Rammstein – Deutschland
Frank Iero – Young and Doomed
Slipknot – All Out Life
|-
!width="50%"|Best British Breakthrough
!width="50%"|Best International Breakthrough (presented by Matt Berry)
|-
|valign="top"|IdlesYonaka
Scarlxrd
Black Peaks
Svalbard
|valign="top"|SWMRSAngel Du$t
The Interrupters
Simple Creatures
Vein
|-
!width="50%"|Best British Act
!width="50%"|Best International Act(presented by Roger Taylor)
|-
|valign="top"|Bring Me the HorizonArchitects
Biffy Clyro
Enter Shikari
Iron Maiden
|valign="top"|MetallicaFoo Fighters
Panic! at the Disco
Rammstein
Slipknot
|-
!width="50%"|Best British Live Act (presented by Caleb Shomo)
!width="50%"|Best International Live Act
|-
|valign="top"|ArchitectsDon Broco
Employed to Serve
Enter Shikari
Frank Carter & the Rattlesnakes
|valign="top"|Metallica'Fever 333
Ghost
Mastodon
Parkway Drive
|-
!width="50%"|Special Achievement awards
|-
|valign="top"|Kerrang! Hall of Fame: Skunk Anansie (presented by Grant Nicholas)Kerrang! Icon: MotörheadKerrang! Inspiration: Jimmy Page (presented by Royal Blood)
|-
|}

Multiple nominations and awards

The following artists received multiple nominations:Three:
 ArchitectsTwo:
 Bring Me the Horizon
 Enter Shikari
 Ghost
 Metallica
 Slipknot
 Rammstein

The following artists received multiple awards:Two'':
 Metallica

References

2019 music awards
Kerrang! Awards
2019 in British music
2019 in London